Ndemli, or Bandem, is a language of Cameroon spoken primarily in the Nkam department of the Littoral Region; between Yabassi, Yingui and Nkondjock. Recent classifications such as Nurse (2003) place it in with the Narrow Grassfields languages, though Ethnologue does not reflect this. Ethnologue states that it is "related to Tikar" and that "the Bandobo dialect of Tikar is very similar to Ndemli", though it is not clear if Bandobo actually is Tikar.

Phonology 

There are five tones; high, mid, low, rising, and falling.

References 

Grassfields Bantu languages
Languages of Cameroon